The 1973 Volvo International – Singles  was one of the competitions of the 1973 Volvo International tennis tournament held in Bretton Woods, New Hampshire, United States, between July 23 and July 29, 1973. The draw comprised 28 players of which eight were seeded. Eighth-seeded Vijay Amritraj won the singles title after a 7–5, 2–6, 7–5 win in the final against first-seeded Jimmy Connors.

Seeds
A champion seed is indicated in bold text while text in italics indicates the round in which that seed was eliminated. The top four seeds received a bye to the second round.

  Jimmy Connors (final)
  Rod Laver (quarterfinals)
  Ian Fletcher (semifinals)
  John Alexander (semifinals)
  Gerald Battrick (quarterfinals)
  Tom Edlefsen (quarterfinals)
  Bob Carmichael (quarterfinals)
  Vijay Amritraj (champion)

Draw

Final

Section 1

Section 2

External links
 1973 Volvo International draw

Tennis tournaments